Grace Christian Academy (GCA) is a Christian private school in West Bay, Grand Cayman, Cayman Islands. It serves up to grade 12 and uses the U.S. educational system. The Hammer family had established it as a ministry of its organization.

References

External links
 Grace Christian Academy

Schools in Grand Cayman
Secondary schools in the Cayman Islands
Christian schools